Hildebrandt's horseshoe bat (Rhinolophus hildebrandtii) is a species of bat in the family Rhinolophidae found in Africa. Its natural habitats are savanna, caves and other subterranean habitats.

References

Rhinolophidae
Mammals described in 1878
Taxonomy articles created by Polbot
Taxa named by Wilhelm Peters
Bats of Africa